Dyson is an English surname. Notable people with the surname include:

Ambrose Dyson (1876–1913), Australian political cartoonist
Andre Dyson (born 1979), American football player
Brian Dyson (born 1935), American businessman
Charles Wilson Dyson (1861–1930), American naval officer
Chris Dyson (born 1978), American racing driver
Edward Dyson (1865–1931), Australian writer and journalist
Edward Ambrose Dyson (1908–1952), Australian illustrator and political cartoonist
Esther Dyson (born 1951), Swiss-born American journalist, author, businesswoman, investor, commentator, and philanthropist
Frank Dyson (1931–1979), British rugby league footballer
Frank Watson Dyson (1868–1939), English astronomer
Freeman Dyson (1923–2020), British-American physicist
Geoff Dyson (1923–1989), English footballer
George Dyson (composer) (1883–1964), English musical composer
George Dyson (science historian) (born 1953), American-Canadian author and science historian
H. Kempton Dyson (1880–1944), English structural engineer and architect
Hugo Dyson (1896–1975), English academic
Humfrey Dyson (1582–1633), English scrivener, notary, and book collector
Jack Dyson (1934–2000), English cricketer and footballer
James Dyson (born 1947), British inventor and engineer
Jeremy Dyson (born 1966), English author, musician, and screenwriter
Jerome Dyson (born 1987), American basketball player in Israel
John Dyson (rugby) (1866–1909), English rugby union player
John Barry Dyson (1942–1995), English footballer
John Dyson, Lord Dyson (born 1943), British judge
John Dyson (Australian cricketer) (born 1954), Australian cricketer
John S. Dyson (fl. 1960s–2020s), American businessman
John Dyson (fl. 1980s), English musician
Kevin Dyson (born 1975), American football player
Kina Malpartida Dyson (born 1980), Peruvian boxer
Marianne J. Dyson (fl. 1990s–2010s), American author
Mia Dyson (born 1981), Australian musician
Michael Eric Dyson (born 1958), American author, preacher, radio host, and professor
Rob Dyson (born 1946), American racing driver
Ronnie Dyson (1950–1990), American singer and actor
Ruth Dyson (born 1957), New Zealand politician
Ruth Dyson (keyboardist) (1917–1997), English keyboardist
Terry Dyson (born 1934), English footballer
Thomas A. Dyson (1851–1898), American politician
Tony Dyson (1947–2016), British special effects designer
Torkwase Dyson (fl. 2000s–2010s), American contemporary artist
Will Dyson (1880–1938), Australian artist, cartoonist, and caricaturist
William Dyson (1857–1936), English cricketer

See also
 Dyson, other uses
 Miles Bennett Dyson, fictional character from the film Terminator 2 who was the most directly responsible for "Judgement Day"

English-language surnames